The following is a list of ice hockey teams in Quebec, past and present. It includes the league(s) they play for, and championships won.

Major professional

National Hockey League

National Hockey Association

World Hockey Association

Minor professional

Canadian-American Hockey League

American Hockey League

International Hockey League

Ligue Nord-Américaine de Hockey

Junior

Quebec Major Junior Hockey League

Ontario Hockey Association

Quebec Junior Hockey League

Greater Metro Junior A Hockey League

Junior B hockey leagues

Semi-professional, senior and amateur

Canadian Women's Hockey League

National Women's Hockey League

Amateur

College

Hockey collégial féminin RSEQ

University

League, regional and national championships

See also

Hockey Québec

Quebec teams
 
Ice hockey teams
Ice hockey teams in Quebec